Planodema scorta is a species of beetle in the family Cerambycidae. It was described by James Thomson in 1858, originally under the genus Domitia.

References

Theocridini
Beetles described in 1858